Matthew Nocita (born April 24, 2000) is an American professional soccer player who plays as a defender for MLS side New York Red Bulls.

Youth and College 
Nocita attended Oaks Christian School , where alongside soccer he competed in track and field and lacrosse while in high school. Nocita earned Academic First Honors in 2015 and 2016, while garnering Academic Highest Honors in Fall 2016 and Head Masters List in Spring 2017. He also played club soccer for USSDA side Real So Cal. In December 2016, it was announced that Nocita had committed to attending the United States Naval Academy.

During his college career, Nocita made 59 appearances for the Midshipmen, scoring six goals and tallying two assists. He earned numerous accolades for the Navy during his time at college, been named a three-time Patriot League Defensive Player of the Year, 2021 FCAC Defensive Player of the Year, and a two-time CoSIDA Academic All-American.

Professional 
On January 11, 2022, Nocita was drafted by the New York Red Bulls as the 7th pick of the 2022 MLS SuperDraft, after they traded up twice to acquire the pick. Following his selection, Nocita was required to apply to delay his Navy service to allow him to play professional. On August 25, 2022, Nocita signed a contract with New York Red Bulls.

References

External links 
 

2000 births
Living people
American soccer players
Association football defenders
Navy Midshipmen men's soccer players
New York Red Bulls draft picks
New York Red Bulls players
New York Red Bulls II players
Major League Soccer players
Soccer players from California
USL Championship players